Murray Exelby (11 October 1912 – 21 October 1987) was an Australian rules footballer who played for Essendon in the Victorian Football League (VFL).

Exelby, a rover and half forward flanker, kicked six goals against Melbourne in the opening round of the 1940 VFL season and finished the year with a career best 24 goals. Recruited from East Brunswick, he was a losing Grand Finalist the following season and a premiership player in 1942, with two goals in the Grand Final win over Richmond. In all he appeared in eight finals during his career. 

He spent the 1945 and 1946 seasons at Preston. After coaching stints with Leongatha and Mitcham, Exelby joined Queensland club Mayne as captain-coach in 1950.

References

Holmesby, Russell and Main, Jim (2007). The Encyclopedia of AFL Footballers. 7th ed. Melbourne: Bas Publishing.

1912 births
1987 deaths
Essendon Football Club players
Essendon Football Club Premiership players
Preston Football Club (VFA) players
Mayne Australian Football Club players
Leongatha Football Club players
Australian rules footballers from Victoria (Australia)
One-time VFL/AFL Premiership players